The Golden Giant Mine is a closed underground gold mine in the Hemlo mining camp in Canada, located north of Lake Superior, midway between Sault Ste. Marie and Thunder Bay, Ontario near the town of Manitouwadge.

History

Prospectors John Larche, Don McKinnon and Richard Hughes discovered gold in the Hemlo camp in the early 1980s, starting a staking rush not seen in Canada since the Klondike gold rush of the late 19th century. Two companies, Golden Sceptre and Goliath Resources, secured rights to a large land package in the area, and were subsequently acquired by Noranda.

Noranda permitted and built the Golden Giant mine in less than two years. With its first pour in April, 1985, the Golden Giant was the first mine in the camp to ship.

Peak production occurred in the early 1990s, approaching 500,000 oz per year. During its 21-year life, the mine produced over 6 million ounces of gold.

Ownership

Noranda formed Hemlo Gold Mines, Inc. to operate the mine. Hemlo merged with U.S.-producer Battle Mountain Gold in 1996. That company, in turn, was acquired by Newmont Mining, which currently owns the property, in 2001.

On September 22, 2010, Barrick Gold completed the acquisition of the Golden Giant Mine Properties at the Hemlo Camp from Newmont Mining Corp.

Geology
The grade of the ore is 0.36, in a host rock of quartz sericite schist.

Operations
The mine produced 446,858 ounces in 1994 with fully automated ore flow.

The mine was designed as a 3000-dry-tonne-per-day operation. With the Block 5 expansion, the mine shaft reached a depth of more than 5000 feet.

Originally owned by Noranda, shaft sinking and development were started by Canadian Mine Enterprises and when that company went bankrupt during 1983 shaft sinking, lateral and raise development, as well as the initial production mining, employing long hole mining methods, were executed by MacIsaac Mining and Tunnelling.

The mill was a conventional leach-CIP circuit. The ore was crushed to 3/8" with standard- and short-head cone crushers. The crushed material was fed to one of two grinding circuits (A-circuit = 3 ball mills, B-circuit = single ball mill). A-circuit was one of the first in the world to include the fully automated Knelson (gravity) concentrator. A second unit was added to the B-Circuit around the year 2000. Concentrate from the Knelsons was upgraded with a shaking table. That unit was replaced with the first Acacia concentrator installed in North America.

After grinding, the ore was fed to the leach circuit where the gold was dissolved. Dissolved gold was recovered in the carbon-in-pulp circuit. Once or twice per week the carbon was treated in a 15-tonne pressure Zadra strip process. Gold was recovered from the pregnant solution on stainless steel wool cathodes in the refinery.

From 1996 onward, much of the tailings were returned to the mine as pastefill backfill.

Current operation

The mine ceased operation in 2005, and closed permanently in 2006. Remnant Sales ended in the second quarter of 2007. Reclamation of the site is underway. Gerrits Drilling & Engineering completed the installation of a number of Interceptor Wells from 2012 - 2014. In October 2008, Richard Hughes, former Noranda executive and founder of the Hemlo deposit and current CEO of Abitibi Mining Corporation (ABB: TSXV), announced that Abitibi Mining is currently exploring a second bedded gold Hemlo-style deposit in the region.

See also
List of mines in Ontario
Geology Of Gold Deposits Of The Hemlo Area (revised edition)
Canadian Mining Journal 'Hemlo's Golden Years'

External links
Official Newmont Site

References

Gold mines in Ontario
Underground mines in Canada
Mines in Northern Ontario